Hauenstein is a Verbandsgemeinde ("collective municipality") in the Südwestpfalz district, in Rhineland-Palatinate, Germany. The seat of the municipality is in Hauenstein.

The Verbandsgemeinde Hauenstein consists of the following Ortsgemeinden ("local municipalities"):

 Darstein 
 Dimbach 
 Hauenstein
 Hinterweidenthal 
 Lug 
 Schwanheim 
 Spirkelbach 
 Wilgartswiesen

Verbandsgemeinde in Rhineland-Palatinate
Palatinate Forest
South Palatinate